Nandigam is a village near major town Palasa in Srikakulam district of the Indian state of Andhra Pradesh. It is located in Nandigam mandal.

Geography
Nandigama is located at 18.39N 84.18E. It has an average elevation of 11 meters (39 feet) above mean sea level.

References 

Villages in Srikakulam district
Mandal headquarters in Srikakulam district